Bedtime Prayers: Lullabies and Peaceful Worship is the fourteenth studio and children's music album by Christian singer-songwriter Twila Paris, released on March 27, 2001 by Sparrow Records. Bedtime Prayers consists of original lullabies written by Paris, with the exception of the William O. Cushing hymn "Jewels." The album was perfectly timed because Paris and her husband Jack Wright were expecting their first child. A month after the album's release, Paris gave birth to their first born son named Jack Paris Wright. It was a name Paris had picked out for 15 years.
The album is produced by John Hartley of the U.K. Christian music duo Phil and John, with additional production by Derald Daugherty, lead singer of the alternative Christian rock group The Choir. Paris won a Dove Award for Children's Music Album of the Year for Bedtime Prayers at the 33rd GMA Dove Awards in 2002. The album reached number one on the Billboard Top Kid Albums chart.

Track listing 
All songs written by Twila Paris, except where noted.
"God Is All Around Us" - 3:51
"Jewels" (William O. Cushing) - 3:09
"My Delight" - 3:02
"Perfect Peace" - 3:22
"My Best Friend" - 3:14
"Your Whole Life Long" - 4:31
"His Beloved" - 2:52
"More Than I Can Say" - 4:28
"There Is Only One" - 4:12
"Bedtime Prayer" - 3:38
"See You Tomorrow" - 3:25
"Blessing" - 3:57

Critical reception 

Ashleigh Kittle of AllMusic said of Bedtime Prayers that "Paris has specifically geared the album toward new mothers and young children. Her aim being to assist parents in teaching their children Biblically based foundational truths that can be carried with them the rest of their lives. The album is beautifully orchestrated, featuring Paris' trademark piano melodies paired with moderate tempos and the vocal vulnerability present on all she sings. Musically, it best reflects a blending of inspirational praise and worship with the gentle, soothing style associated with lullabies."

Tony Cummings of Cross Rhythms recommended Bedtime Prayers saying "If you're looking for a perfect gift for a new mum (sorry, mom) here's a delicate worshipful music that features excellent musicianship and prayers to the Father as it woos the little darling asleep."

Personnel 

 Twila Paris - lead vocals
 Tom Howard - keyboards, orchestral arrangements
 Adam DePasquale - keyboards, programming, tenor recorder
 Jamie Kenney - keyboards, programming
 Phil Keaggy - guitars
 Chris Rodriguez - guitars, backing vocals
 Gary Burnette - guitars
 Jared DePasquale - guitars
 Chris Donohue - bass guitar
 Danny O'Lannerghty - bass guitar
 Al Perkins - pedal steel guitar
 Phil Madeira - B-3 organ
 John Mark Painter - brass, accordion, penny whistle
 John Mock - penny whistle, low whistle, harmonium
 Ken Lewis - percussion
 Eric Darken - percussion
 Carl Gorodetzky - violin
 Pam Sixfin - violin
 Kristin Wilkinson - viola
 Bob Mason - cello
 Chris Eaton - backing vocals
 Felicia Sorenson - backing vocals
 Molly Felder - backing vocals

Production 

 John Hartley - producer
 Derald Daugherty - additional producer, recording
 Lynn Nichols - executive producer
 Jim Dineen - recording
 Jordan Richter - recording
 David Streit - assistant recording
 Brian Boyd - assistant recording
 Brian Tankersley - mixing at GTB Studio, Franklin, Tennessee
 Sam Hewitt - assistant mixing
 Hank Williams - mastering at MasterMix, Nashville, Tennessee
 Neverland Studios, Nashville, Tennessee - recording location
 Bennett House, Franklin, Tennessee - recording location
 Dark House Recording, Franklin, Tennessee - recording location
 DePasquale Studio, Nashville, Tennessee - recording location
 Kegworth Studio, Nashville, Tennessee - recording location
 The Mission, Nashville, Tennessee - recording location
 Jan Cook - art director
 Wayne Brezinka - art director
 Christiév Carothers - creative director
 Katherine Stratton - design
 Russ Harrington - photographer

Companion book 
Paris has also released a companion book called Bedtime Prayers and Lullabies published by Harvest House Publishers. Accompanied with illustration paintings by Kathryn Andrews Fincher, the book gives new parents simple prayers and soothing lullabies to newborn babies and toddlers.

Charts

Accolades 
GMA Dove Awards

References

2001 albums
Twila Paris albums
Sparrow Records albums
Children's music albums by American artists